Exterran Corporation was set up in 2007 until it was acquired by Enerflex on October 11, 2022 and was headquartered in Houston, Texas. Exterran engaged in oil and natural gas production, processing, treating,  transportation, produced water treatment solutions and other related applications. Currently (2013.12) there are mainly three segments: Contract Operations segment, Aftermarket Services segment, Fabrication segment. 2013,.4, Exterran Partners LP acquired compression assets from the Exterran.

On Nov. 4, 2015, Exterran Corporation (NYSE:EXTN) announced the completion of its previously announced spin-off from Exterran Corporation and emerged as an independent, publicly traded company. Exterran Corporation which was formerly the international services and global fabrication businesses of Exterran Corporation is involved in natural gas compression, production and processing products and services. Exterran was formed when Universal Compression (1954) merged with Hanover (1990) in 2007. Universal Compression went public in 2000 and then acquired Weatherford, Global and Gas Compression Services, KCI, LCM and TCS. Hanover acquired APSI and POI to enter the gas processing business, and reorganized into GBU concept before the merger.

Products 
Contract Operations
Contract Operations business line owns a fleet of natural gas production, processing and compression equipment, and crude oil equipment. As of December 31, 2012, the Company's North America contract operations segment owns a fleet of 7,651 natural gas compression units with an aggregate capacity of approximately 3,376,000 horsepower and production and processing facilities. while the international contract operations segment owns a fleet of 1,032 natural gas compression units with 1,265,000 horsepower and a fleet of production and processing equipment.
Fabrication
Fabrication business line provides engineering, procurement and fabrication services mainly for the critical process equipment for refinery and petrochemical facilities. Besides it also provides fabrication for tank farms, evaporators and brine heaters. The products include line heaters, oil and natural gas separators, condensate stabilizers, mechanical refrigeration and some onshore and offshore production facilities
Aftermarket Services
Aftermarket Services business line provides components and maintenance related services to customers who have bought their equipment.

Operations 
In April 2018 Castle Harlan purchased the North American oil and gas production equipment assets of the company, forming a new firm called Titan Production Equipment.

In November 2020, Compass Energy Systems purchased Exterran's US natural gas compression assets. The acquisition included the company's 40-acre Brittmoore Road fabrication facility in Houston, Texas, and a number of employees.

Managerial practice 
In 2011, Mr. Danner departed as President and Chief Executive Officer, and Exterran named D. Bradley Childers president and chief executive officer (CEO) of Exterran.

Andrew J. Way served as the CEO and the President of the company. Here is a list of Exterran Corporation senior officers and directors 
(2018):
 Mark R. Sotir		Executive Chairman of the Board
 Andrew J. Way		President, Chief Executive Officer
 James C. Gouin                Director since November 2015
 Valerie L. Banner		 Vice President, General Counsel and Secretary
 David A. Barta		Senior Vice President and Chief Financial Officer
 Roger George		Senior Vice President, Global Engineering and Product Lines
 Christine M. Michel          Senior Vice President, Global Human Resources and Communications
 Girish K. Saligram       Senior Vice President, Global Services
 Michael W. Sanders       Vice President and Chief Accounting Officer
 David S. Vaughn		Vice President, Global Health, Safety, Security and Environment

Research & development 
2013.12, Black & Veatch and Exterran Energy Solutions, L.P. signed an exclusive agreement to develop modular natural gas processing units (Black & Veatch’s patented PRICO-C2™ process).

References 

Business services companies established in 2007
Companies listed on the New York Stock Exchange
Oilfield services companies
Companies based in Houston